Nam Yuen is the southernmost district (amphoe) of Ubon Ratchathani province, northeastern Thailand.

History
A group of people from Det Udom moved to Ban Chanla Na Dom of Champassak during the reign of King Mongkut. Later in 1881 the king of Champassak proposed to King Chulalongkorn to upgrade Ban Chanla Na Dom to Mueang Dom Pradit, under the control of the Champassak Kingdom. When Champask became part of French Indochine, Mueang Dom Pradit was downgraded to be a tambon of Det Udom district. As the area of Det Udom was very large, the governor of Ubon Ratchathani proposed to the government to establish a minor district (king amphoe). This was created on 17 March 1969 by splitting off the four tambons: Song, Ta Kao, Yang, and Dom Pradit. It was upgraded to a full district on 29 March 1974.

The district, where the borders of Thailand, Laos, and Cambodia intersect, has long been the site of battles over disputed territory. In the 1980s, minefields were laid by Cambodia and Thailand on  Hill 500, part of Phanom Dong Rak mountain. The Thailand Mines Action Centre (TMAC) of the Royal Thai Armed Forces and the Thai Civilian Deminer Association (TCDA) have cleared mines from the area for several years. They have succeeded in clearing 43.4 km2 as of 2020. Another three years will be required to clear the remaining 29.7 km2.

Etymology
The name Nam Yuen has two origins: the district office was in Nam Yuen village; also, the area has three rivers, the Bon (ห้วยบอน), Chong (ห้วยโชง), and Ta Em (ห้วยตาเอ็ม). Nam Yuen means 'long-lasting water'.

Geography
Neighboring districts are (from the west clockwise) Nam Khun, Det Udom, Na Chaluai of Ubon Ratchathani Province, Champasak of Laos and Preah Vihear of Cambodia.

The Dom Yai River is an important water resource.

The highest summits of the Phanom Dong Rak Range, including Phu Khi Suk (753 m), Phu Khok Yai (693 m), Phu Chep Thong (692 m), Phu Tangok (689 m) and Chong Bok (603 m) are in this district, in the area where the borders of Thailand, Laos, and Cambodia intersect.

Administration
The district is divided into seven sub-districts (tambons), which are further subdivided into 92 villages (mubans). Nam Yuen itself is a township (thesaban tambon) and covers parts of tambons  Song and Si Wichian. There are a further seven tambon administrative organizations (TAO).

Missing numbers are tambon which now form District Nam Khun

References

External links
amphoe.com

Nam Yuen